Major-General Sir Oliver Richardson Newmarch  (1834–1920) was a senior British Indian Army officer who served as Military Secretary to the India Office.

Military career
Born the son of Doctor Newmarch and Violet, daughter of Colonel Sherwood, Royal Artillery, Newmarch was educated at Charterhouse School and Merton College, Oxford. Newmarch entered the Indian Army in 1855, and was later commissioned into the Bengal Staff Corps and posted to the 44th Native Infantry.

Newmarch saw service during the Indian Mutiny and received a medal for his work during it.

Newmarch served as the Military Secretary to the Government of India from 1884 to 1887. Newmarch was appointed Military Secretary to the India Office in 1889 and served in that role until 1899. While in that role, he was appointed KCSI in 1894.

Family
In 1858 he married Mary Isabella Parke and they went on to have one son and one daughter. She died in 1867 and he then married Agnes Mary Norman in 1874.

References

 

1834 births
1920 deaths
British Indian Army generals
Knights Commander of the Order of the Star of India
People educated at Charterhouse School
Alumni of Merton College, Oxford
Bengal Staff Corps officers
British military personnel of the Indian Rebellion of 1857